A list of films produced by the Bollywood film industry based in Mumbai in 1949:

Highest-grossing films
The nine highest-grossing films at the Indian Box Office in 1949:

A-B

C-J

K-R

S-Z

There is also unreleased movies called Vashishta Warwadevi(1949) and Main kaali pili nachaniya(1949) and not many details are available for them

References

External links
 Bollywood films of 1949 at the Internet Movie Database

1949
Bollywood
Films, Bollywood